Ecke is a surname.

List of people with the surname 

 Gustav Ecke (1896–1971), German-American historian
 Matthias Ecke (born 1983), German politician
 Paul Ecke Ranch, American florist
 Robert Ecke, American experimental physicist

Other 

 Carl Ecke, piano company

See also 

 Eek
 Eckes

Surnames
Surnames of German origin